Crossing the Red Sea with The Adverts is the debut studio album by English punk rock band the Adverts. It was released on 17 February 1978 by record label Bright.

Background 
Crossing the Red Sea with The Adverts was recorded at Abbey Road Studios. The album title was coined by Jane Suck.

Release 
The album was preceded by the single "No Time to Be 21", which reached No. 34 on the UK Singles Chart. Crossing the Red Sea with The Adverts reached No. 38 on the UK Albums Chart.

Critical reception 

In a retrospective review for AllMusic, Dave Thompson called the album "a devastating debut" and "one of the finest albums not only of the punk era but of the 1970s as a whole". Trouser Press said that "in its own way", the album "is the equal of the first Sex Pistols or The Clash; a hasty statement that captures an exciting time".

Legacy 
In March 2003, Mojo magazine ranked Crossing the Red Sea No. 17 in its list of the 50 greatest punk albums. The album featured in The Guardians list "1000 Albums to Hear Before You Die".

Track listing

Original release

2002 re-issue

Personnel 
 The Adverts
 T. V. Smith – vocals
 Gaye Advert – bass guitar, vocals
 Howard Pickup – guitar, vocals
 Laurie Driver – drums

 Technical
 John Leckie – production
 Nicholas De Ville – design
 Martin Durrant – cover photography

References

External links 
 

The Adverts albums
1978 debut albums
Albums produced by John Leckie
Fire Records (UK) albums